Stenoptilodes heppneri is a moth of the family Pterophoridae that is known from Venezuela.

Adults are on wing in January.

Etymology
The species is named after its collector, a promoter of the research of Lepidoptera, Dr J.B. Heppner.

External links

heppneri
Moths described in 2006
Endemic fauna of Venezuela
Moths of South America
Taxa named by Cees Gielis